Marikozhundhu is a 1991 Tamil-language drama film directed by Pudhiyavan, an erstwhile assistant of Bharathiraja. The film stars Ramesh Aravind and Aishwarya, with Manorama, Vinu Chakravarthy, Nassar, Goundamani and Senthil playing supporting roles. It was released on 3 May 1991.

Plot

The film starts with the modern girl Chithra and her father Seenu getting off the train in a small village called Marikozhundhupatti. The villagers receive them with a lot of respect because of her late mother Marikozhundhu, Chithra is surprised by the welcome. Chithra's father finally tells what happened in the past.

Marikozhundhu lived a precarious life with her grandmother. Marikozhundhu was a kind-hearted person but she was not a good-looking woman, her dream was to get married as soon as possible. Seenu was a college student who lived with his mother in the city, for the holiday he always went to his father's village. There, Seenu was intrigued by the stubborn Marikozhundhu and he smiled each time he saw her, Marikozhundhu thought he loved her. Afterwards, the two had a sexual intercourse in the fields. At the village court, the elders arranged their marriage the next day. The day of the marriage, Marikozhundhu realized that Seenu seemed to dislike her and stopped the marriage. Seenu was in fact in love with his childhood sweetheart Uma. Seenu's father wanted his son to marry Uma, but his mother wanted her son to marry Marikozhundhu. Shortly after, Marikozhundhu became pregnant and her grandmother died.

One year later, Marikozhundhu gave birth to a baby girl. Seenu's father begged her to leave the village so that his son could marry Uma without any remorse. Marikozhundhu and her baby girl left the village, she then listened that the local factory owner had dumped toxic mercury waste from his factory into the village water. The village was close to celebrate a water ceremony, so Marikozhundhu tried to stop it but nobody believed her. Marikozhundhu had no choice than to drink the contaminated water thus she died. Seenu tied the thaali around her neck (synonym of marriage) just before she died.

Chithra breaks into tears after hearing the flashback, and she feels very proud of her late mother.

Cast

Ramesh Aravind as Seenu
Aishwarya as Marikozhundhu and Chithra
Manorama as Seenu's mother
Vinu Chakravarthy as Seenu's father
Nassar
Goundamani as a building constructor
Senthil as the building constructor's assistant
Radhabhai as Marikozhundhu's grandmother
Anjana as Uma
M. R. Krishnamurthy as Kanakku Pillai
Bhavani as Ezhuthu
Vasu as Munusamy
Joker Thulasi
Gnanavel as Nattamai
V. P. Rajan
Poornima
Shobana
Supraja
Naveena
Vijay Ganesh

Soundtrack

The film score and the soundtrack were composed by Deva. The soundtrack, released in 1991, features nine tracks with lyrics written by Vaali and Kamakodiyan.

References

1991 films
Films scored by Deva (composer)
1990s Tamil-language films
Indian drama films